Captain Samarakoon Wasala Mudiyanselage Saliya Upul Aladeniya, PWV, SLRS (in Sinhalese: කපිතාන් සාලිය උපුල් අලදෙනිය; 1 March 1963 – 11 June 1990) was a Sri Lankan soldier and the second recipient of the Parama Weera Vibhushanaya, Sri Lanka's highest wartime award for valor. He was commanding the small army detachment at Kokavil; when it was surrounded he refused to abandon the injured and fought until they were overrun by the Liberation Tigers of Tamil Eelam (LTTE).

Early life
Born in Kandy, his father was a planter in the State Plantations Corporation and a captain in the Ceylon Volunteer Force. He had two siblings. Educated at Trinity College Kandy, he worked in a small estate owned by his family.

Military service
He joined the Sri Lanka Army in 1989 as a volunteer officer. Following a short commissioning course at the Sri Lanka Military Academy, he was commissioned as second lieutenant in the 2nd (V) Battalion, Sri Lanka Sinha Regiment. He served with the battalion in Nuwara Eliya during the later stages of the 1987–1989 JVP insurrection. He was later transferred to the 3rd (V) Battalion, Sinha Regiment and was attached to the A company.

Battle of Kokavil

On 18 May 1990, the A Company with three officers was deployed the Mankulam. Two officers and 58 men from A Company was dispatched to an isolated army outpost at Kokuvla (Kokavil) that was established for guarding the television relay station. Aladeniya as a Second Lieutenant was part of that detachment. On June 5, the LTTE Mankulam and was repulsed killing 43 militants.

On the 11 June 1990, the Sri Lankan government ordered over 600 police officers to surrender to the LTTE after their police stations were surrounded, who were then massacred. The next day Mankulam and Kokavil were surrounded by the LTTE. On June 16, there was a ceasefire, the Captain in charge of the camp and fifteen others went on leave. Leaving Lieutenant Aladeniya in charge.

On 27 June, the camp was surrounded for several days by LTTE cadres who outnumbered them five to one. The food and water were running out in the camp and so was the ammunition. In spite of many requests, reinforcements sent from Wanni headquarters never reached Kokavil, having been diverted elsewhere. On July 11, orders to withdraw from the camp came at the eleventh hour but then it was too late and Aladeniya had wounded men whom he did not want to leave behind. Pledging that he would rather die alongside them than leave them, Lt. Aladeniya ordered the only civilian in the camp (a cook) to leave and fought on till an adjacent fuel dump exploded, killing the majority of the defenders in the camp. Since his body was not recovered he was not listed as missing in action.

Aladeniya was posthumously promoted to rank of captain and awarded the Parama Weera Vibhushanaya medal on June 21, 1994, by the president DB Wijetunga. In offensive operations in 2009, the Sri Lanka Army recaptured Kokavil. In 2011, the transmition tower was rebuilt and a monument to Aladeniya and his men was built.

Family
At the time of his death Aladeniya was married.

See also
Awards and decorations of the military of Sri Lanka

References

SPUR
 "50 YEARS ON" – 1949–1999 (1st edition, 1999). Sri Lanka Army. .

External links
Sri Lanka Army
Ministry of Defence : Sri Lanka
Media Center for National Security : Sri Lanka
SPUR

1964 births
1990 deaths
Sinha Regiment officers
Sri Lanka Army Volunteer Force officers
Recipients of the Parama Weera Vibhushanaya
Military personnel killed in action
Alumni of Trinity College, Kandy
Sri Lanka Military Academy graduates
Sri Lankan military personnel killed in action
Sinhalese military personnel